Joking Bad or Lollu Sabha Breaking Bad is a 2023 Indian Tamil-language Parody  streaming television series written and directed by Rahul Raj for Netflix India.  It is a Sequel to the 2003 series Lollu Sabha, which aired on Star Vijay from 2003 to 2008. Is returning for a spoof on the hit American crime drama television series Breaking Bad. 

The show Produced by Mohana Krishnan under the banner of Yali Entertainment. The music was composed by Arjun Manohar. The show stars Swaminathan, Manohar, Jeeva, Seshu, Monkey Ravi, Udhayakumar and Venkat Raja. The one episodic series premiered on Netflix India YouTube Channel on 20 January 2023.

Cast
 Swaminathan as Walter Vetrivel
 Manohar as Jessie Rosapayan
 Jeeva as Saul Kavarimaan
 Seshu as Gus Annachi
 Monkey Ravi as Doctor
 Udhayakumar as Hector 'Bell Thatha'
 Venkat Raja as Hank

References 

Tamil-language web series
2023 Tamil-language television series debuts
Tamil-language comedy television series
Tamil-language Netflix original programming
Tamil-language sequel television series
Tamil-language television series based on American television series